George Bailey (September 25, 1900 in Indianapolis, Indiana – May 7, 1940 in Indianapolis, Indiana) was an American racecar driver active in the 1930s. He was killed in a crash during practice for the 1940 Indianapolis 500, when his gasoline tank exploded. He lost control of his car and skidded sideways into a concrete wall. It spun back across the track and hit the inside guard rail, causing the gasoline tank to explode.

Bailey became the first competitor to drive a rear-engined car in the Indianapolis 500 when he contested the 1939 race in a Gulf-Miller.

Indy 500 results

References

See also
 List of fatalities at Indianapolis

1900 births
1940 deaths
Indianapolis 500 drivers
Racing drivers from Indianapolis
Racing drivers who died while racing
Sports deaths in Indiana